RTP Madeira is a Portuguese free-to-air regional television channel owned and operated by state-owned public broadcaster Rádio e Televisão de Portugal (RTP) in the Autonomous Region of Madeira. It began broadcasting on 6 August 1972.

It is broadcast in the Madeira Islands and via cable and satellite in the Azores Islands and continental Portugal. RTP Madeira serves as a regional opt-out to the national public television channel, RTP1.

History
RTP planned the start of a television service in Madeira as early as 1971, but the building of the transmitters was delayed due to adverse climatic conditions. The first experimental broadcasts were conducted on June 30, 1972, with regular broadcasts starting on August 6.

References

External links
 RTP Madeira Official Website
 RTP Madeira Live Stream on RTP Play

Publicly funded broadcasters
Mass media in Portugal
Television channels and stations established in 1972
Television stations in Portugal
Portuguese-language television stations
1972 establishments in Portugal
Rádio e Televisão de Portugal
Madeiran society
Mass media in Funchal